The 4th Dimension is an independent film directed by Tom Mattera and Dave Mazzoni and starring Louis Morabito, Miles Williams, Karen Peakes, Kate LaRoss, and Suzanne Inman. It premiered at the Philadelphia International Film Festival on April 1, 2006, and was released by TLA Entertainment Group on April 8, 2008.

Awards

The film received the following awards:

Festivals
 Winner: Grand Jury Honorable Mention, Cinevegas
 Winner: Technical Achievement Award, Philadelphia Film Festival
 Official Selection: Montreal World Film Festival
 Official Selection: Brussels International Festival of Fantasy Film
 Official Selection: Amsterdam Fantastic Film Festival
 Official Selection: Utopiales-Nantes International Science Fiction Festival – France

Critical reaction

Robert Koehler of Variety stated, "An alice-like rabbit hole of suppressed memories...simmering with neurotic emotions and surreal dream states." The film's opening images "suggest that what follows may be induced by dreams. However, co-directors Tom Mattera and Dave Mazzoni are just as concerned with establishing Jack's reality in the present (in a bric-a-brac stuffed antique shop where he fixes clocks and other contraptions) and the past (where a dazzling single-shot scene dramatizes in capsule form the boy's sad life with his ill mom).

JimmyO Arrowinthehead.com said, "A visually stunning work of art".

Michael Rechtshaffen of The Hollywood Reporter stated, "Stylistically channeling David Lynch and Darren Aronofsky, The 4th Dimension is a densely etched portrait of a young man's descent into insanity", while also noting that the film "doesn't quite jell into a satisfyingly coherent whole."

References

External links 
 

2006 films
2000s English-language films